Hair of the Dog Brewing Company is a brewery in Portland, Oregon. Several of its beers are bottle conditioned. The tasting room in southeast Portland's Buckman neighborhood closed on June 26, 2022.

Alan Sprints is the owner and brewer with a few helpers, including his sister and his three sons. He graduated from Le Cordon Bleu culinary school. He was president of the home brewers club Oregon Brew Crew, prior to founding Hair of the Dog in 1993.

The brewery's biggest claim to fame was its barley wine, Dave. Its Eve beer was frozen distilled three times. The brewery's Adam beer is a recreation of an Adambier, a historic brew that was originally made in Dortmund, Germany.

See also
Brewing in Oregon

References

Further reading
 "The Hop Brief: Hair of the Dog Blue Dot Double IPA". Seattle Post-Intelligencer. March 9, 2011.
 Hair of the Dog turns 20: Small brewery, big reputation | OregonLive.com
 Today in Bro, 1% Want Edition: A $2,000 Craft Beer: The Q: GQ
 'Dave,' Craft Beer By Hair Of The Dog, Costs $2,000 A Bottle
 Roadtripping USA: The Complete Coast-to-Coast Guide to America - Let's Go, Inc.. p. 620.

External links
 

1993 establishments in Oregon
American companies established in 1993
Beer brewing companies based in Portland, Oregon
Buckman, Portland, Oregon
Food and drink companies established in 1993